The  is a Japanese aerial lift line in Onomichi, Hiroshima, operated by the city government. Opened in 1957, the line climbs Mount Senkōji of Senkō-ji, a famous temple. Senkōji Park around the temple is famous for its cherry blossoms in spring.

Basic data
Cable length: 
Vertical interval:

See also
List of aerial lifts in Japan

External links
 Senkōji Park, from Onomichi City official website.

Aerial tramways in Japan
1957 establishments in Japan